"Rain" is a song by American singer Madonna from her fifth studio album Erotica (1992). The song was released on July 19, 1993, by Maverick Records as the album's fifth single internationally and the fourth single in North America. It was later included on her ballad compilation album Something to Remember (1995). The song was written and produced by Madonna and Shep Pettibone. A pop and R&B ballad. "Rain" features a more "friendly" composition than the other singles released from the album. Lyrically the song likens rain to the empowering effect of love, and as with water's ability to clean and wash away pain. Like the other songs on Erotica, sexual contact is also a possible interpretation of the song.

"Rain" received positive response from music critics, who noted it as an exceptional ballad amongst the overtly sexual content on Erotica. It peaked at number 14 on the Billboard Hot 100 in the United States, while becoming a top-10 hit in Australia, Canada, Ireland, Italy, Japan, and the United Kingdom. The accompanying music video, shot by director Mark Romanek, features Madonna singing the song against various backdrops on a set. The music video was praised by many critics for its innovation and cinematography. Madonna has only performed the song during The Girlie Show World Tour in 1993, while a remixed version of the song was used as a video interlude during her 2008–09 Sticky & Sweet Tour.

Background and release 
After the completion of filming A League of Their Own, Madonna began working on her fifth studio album Erotica with Shep Pettibone. "Rain" was one of the first songs developed for the album, alongside "Deeper and Deeper", "Erotica", and "Thief of Hearts", during the writing session in October and November 1991. According to Pettibone, these songs were essentially Madonna's stories and the things she wanted to say. "Rain" was written and produced together by Madonna and Pettibone. She had initially written the song for a musical adaptation of the 1939 film, Wuthering Heights to be directed by Alek Keshishian. Pettibone also sequenced, programmed, and played keyboards for the song. The recording process was engineered by P. Dennis Mitchell and Robin Hancock, while the mixing was engineered by Goh Hotoda. Another musician involved was Tony Shimkin, who provided the drum programming.

"Rain" was released as the fifth single from Erotica on July 19, 1993, in the United Kingdom and on August 5, 1993, in the United States. The song served as the album's fourth single in the United States and Canada since the previous single, "Fever", was not commercially released there. The single release featured a previously unreleased track, "Up Down Suite", which is a 12-minute dub version of "Goodbye to Innocence", an omitted track recorded during the Erotica sessions. This version of the single also included a Danny Saber remix of the album track "Waiting" which features a rap by Everlast. In the United Kingdom, the single included the 1986 track "Open Your Heart" which was being used in a Peugeot car commercial at the time. "Rain" was later included on Madonna's ballads compilation Something to Remember (1995) and has not appeared on any other compilation since.

Composition 

"Rain" is a pop and R&B ballad with influences from trip hop and new-age music. Styled in adult contemporary format, the song is more "friendly" in its sound than the other singles released from Erotica. According to the sheet music published by Alfred Music Publishing, the song is written in the key note of B major. The song's tempo is set in a moderate pace, but not too fast and has a metronome of 92 beats per minute. "Rain" begins with Madonna singing "I feel it, it's coming", and followed by the chord progression of Bsus2–E6/9–F in the chorus and later E–F–B in the verse. A dark sounding C minor string and an echoing hi-hat accompanies Madonna's vocals, which are sung in her lowest register. The song's arrangement captures turbulent elements associated with rain (such as thunder), orchestral stabs that invokes crisp lightning bolts, and a surging bridge segue driven by what sounds like electric guitar snarls. A key change happens towards the end from B major to C major, followed by two spoken parts and a harmony alongside it. The coda has a different melody included with it, and the song ends in a group chorus without the harmonies.

Lyrically, Madonna compares rain with feelings of love. Just as rain washes away dirt, love washes clean the sorrows of the past, leaving a person and their lover to focus on their feelings of the present moment. Richard Harrington from The Washington Post described "Rain" as "an optimistic Peter Gabriel-like ballad in which water is a metaphor for love ('Wash away my sorrow, take away my pain')." According to Stephen Sears from music website Idolator, "the synths turbo-charge at 2:46 into a sleek middle eight that features dueling Madonnas reciting lines of poetry out of the left and right channels [play it on earbuds]. 'By sheer force of will / I'll raise you from the ground', she says softly, 'And without a sound, you'll appear and surrender to me, to love'." Sal Cinquemani from Slant Magazine thought lyrically the ballads on Erotica to be primarily concerned with sex, saying that some might even view "Rain" as an extended metaphor for ejaculation, though he didn't subscribe to that knee-jerk interpretation.

Critical reception 

Upon release, "Rain" received generally positive feedback. Stephen Thomas Erlewine from AllMusic called "Rain" among "Madonna's best and most accomplished music". Jose F. Promis from the same media credited the song in "paving the way for the "softer" Madonna to emerge in the mid-'90s". Annie Zaleski from The A.V. Club stated that it established Madonna as "a sensual New Age goddess". While reviewing the album for Billboard, Paul Verna called the song "a lovely pop ballad". In a separate review of the single on the magazine, another editor, Larry Flick wrote:
A gorgeous, romantic moment from [Madonna]'s sorely underappreciated Erotica opus. A slow and seductive rhyme base surrounded by cascading, sparkling synths inspires a sweet and charming vocal. Though not as lyrically daring as the previous "Bad Girl", this is a wonderfully constructed, memorable tune that deserves as much attention (and airplay) as it can garner. In August 2018, Billboard picked it as the singer's 73rd greatest single, calling it "a top 20 hit of perfectly polished R&B co-produced by Shep Pettibone. Built around one of pop music's most timeless central lyrical images, it's got a depth of production and vocal nuance that suggests Madonna's spin on a great late-'80s Jimmy Jam and Terry Lewis slow jam". Tony Power from Blender picked it as one of the stand-out tracks from Erotica. Scott Kearnan from website Boston.com felt that the song is an example of "what she lacks in [singing] technique she's always tried to make up for with earnestness". He also praised her phrasing, saying that "Madonna sings like she believes in every word". Troy J. Augusto from Cashbox commented, "Simple yet effective number sounds like a love-scene accompaniment from Beverly Hills 90210. At times. Miss Ciccone almost sounds like Karen Carpenter, all tender and shy. (My God, there's no limit to this artist's depth!)" Writing for The Huffington Post, Matthew Jacobs placed the track at number 43 of his list "The Definitive Ranking Of Madonna Singles" and felt the track was a departure from the previous "carnal" releases from Erotica; "It's not terribly distinctive from the other ballads Madonna released in the early '90s, but then there's the sultry chorus with the uplifting lilt 'Here comes the sun'". Stephen Sears from music website Idolator called the song as "the album's sole expression of pure love", which "revisits the oceanic sonic landscape of her epic 1986 ballad "Live To Tell".

Chris Willman from Los Angeles Times criticized its lyrics, saying: "Despite having crafted some of the best singles of the '80s, and despite being a genuine wit, Madonna can tend toward terribly banal rhymes". Medium's Richard LaBeau deemed it "one of the best ballads of Madonna’s career that never got the attention or respect it deserved (probably because it was released amidst the most controversial stage of her career)". Alan Jones from Music Week gave it four out of five, noting it as "one of the less inspired tracks from Erotica". James Hamilton from the magazine's RM Dance Update called it a "sombre cooing ballad". Stephen Holden from The New York Times described it as "one happy, open-hearted love song". Arion Berger from Rolling Stone noted it as a "yearning ballad". Sal Cinquemani from Slant Magazine wrote, "Madonna's rarely acknowledged harmonies glide atop the frosty beats, thunder-claps of percussion, and skyward drone of the sonorous 'Rain'". Charles Aaron from Spin wrote that the song "works a timeless, wrenching scenario: Our heroine waits on a mountaintop for love to wash away her sorrow". Alfred Soto from Stylus Magazine dismissed it as a "slushy rewrite of that year's 'This Used to Be My Playground', itself a slushy rewrite of Like a Prayers 'Promise to Try'". While ranking Madonna's singles in honor of her 60th birthday, Jude Rogers from The Guardian placed the track at number 18 and called it "Eroticas most properly erogenous moment".

Matthew Rettenmund, author of Encyclopedia Madonnica complimented the vocals on the song, calling them "elegantly layered... and an inventive, overlapping vocal rap that makes it a standout production". Chris Wade, author of The Music of Madonna felt that "Rain" was placed in the perfect sequence on Erotica, "to lift the album from its arguable slight drop in quality [with previous tracks 'Waiting' and 'Words']". Rikky Rooksby, author of The Complete Guide to the Music of Madonna complimented the radio friendly sound of the song, but felt that the lyrics "had been used in countless songs", rendering them incoherent.

Chart performance 
In the United States, "Rain" peaked at number 14 on the Billboard Hot 100 and spent a total of 20 weeks on the chart. On its component chart, the song reached number 11 on the Hot 100 Airplay and number 31 on the Hot Singles Sales. "Rain" was a considerable hit on Top 40 and adult contemporary radio stations, reaching number seven on both the Mainstream Top 40 and the Adult Contemporary charts. Additionally, the single also peaked at number 38 on the Rhythmic Top 40 and number 13 on the Hot Dance Music/Maxi-Singles Sales. The song was eventually allocated the number 67 position on the Billboard Hot 100 year-end chart for 1993. In 2013, Billboard ranked it as the 40th Madonna's biggest hit in the United States. In Canada, "Rain" achieved its highest chart placement, peaking at number two on the weekly Top Singles chart compiled by RPM magazine on September 18, 1993. It also became a top-ten hit on the RPMs Adult Contemporary chart, reaching number seven on October 23, 1993. It became the 15th best-selling single of 1993 in Canada.

"Rain" also found commercial success on several countries outside North America. In Australia, the song debuted at number 21 on the charts before rising and peaking at number five. The song remained her longest-charting single, staying in the charts for 20 weeks, until "Hung Up" (2005) remained on the charts for a total of 23 weeks. It was certified gold by the Australian Recording Industry Association (ARIA) for shipments of 35,000 copies. In the United Kingdom, the song was also a success, peaking at number seven on the UK Singles Chart. According to the Official Charts Company, "Rain" has sold 130,771 copies in the United Kingdom as of August 2008. "Rain" also reached the top ten in Ireland, as well as the top twenty in New Zealand, Sweden and Switzerland.

Music video 

The music video for "Rain" was filmed by director Mark Romanek during May 16–19, 1993 at a Santa Monica Airport hangar in Santa Monica, California. Other production crews include Krista Montagna as the producer, Harris Savides as the director of photography, Jon Peter Flack as the production designer, Robert Duffy as the editor, and David Bradshaw as the wardrobe stylist. The video displays Madonna during a film shoot, with Japanese composer Ryuichi Sakamoto playing the director alongside a Japanese film crew. Romanek and Madonna initially wanted to get Jean-Luc Godard or Federico Fellini to play the director in the video. Romanek commented: "I came up with the basic idea of setting it in Tokyo and showing the film crew. It was very Zen, very stripped away. She was this accessible, vulnerable creature surrounded by the high-tech and the global." The director's primary inspiration came from watching a commercial by Jean-Baptiste Mondino, starring actress Catherine Deneuve. Madonna was also seen reclining on a riveted aluminium chaise longue known as the Lockheed Lounge, designed by then unknown Marc Newson.

The video begins with Madonna in a studio, lying on a sofa with headphones on her ears composing a song, following a sequence in which she sings in front of a microphone, which alternates with those of her receiving instructions from the director. She then appears in front of a background of bright lights, representing the sun-lit sky, and also in a scene of her kissing a man behind glass on which water falls. The video ends with an air view of open umbrellas covering the entire floor. Madonna introduced another completely new persona for the video. She wore a wig which provides "a waif-like cap of short black hair with spiky bangs." She also removed her trademark mole and got her eyebrows back, which had been virtually invisible in her previous videos. The look took inspirations from Paris in the 1940s, cabaret singer Édith Piaf and ingenues in general. Rei Kawakubo of Comme des Garcons provided the minimalist black clothes in the video, while the ethereal white clothes was designed by Vivienne Westwood.

The video premiered on June 21, 1993, on MTV, and later won two categories for Best Art Direction and Best Cinematography at the 1993 MTV Video Music Awards. It was ranked number 70 on Slant Magazines "100 Greatest Music Videos" list. Sal Cinquemani from the publication called it as one of Madonna's most beautiful music video and said, "The waterlogged clip was a simple and refreshing break from the singer's visually sex-drenched Erotica period." He also pointed out that despite its innocent look, "it's difficult to separate the images from the song's double entendres." Jef Rouner from Houston Press called the video "one of Romanek's more light-hearted and definitely the most... purple of his work," as well as "a fascinating treatise on the act of creating a music video itself." Bryant Frazer from Studio Daily described it as a futuristic, overexposed look influenced by Japanese fashion imagery." He noted that the video "pushed the boundaries of telecine work at the time." Rettenmund called the video a "masterpiece about art and artifice". He noted that although Romanek expressed to create a video "devoid of nostalgia", instead the "Rain" clip "created a modern enigma [out of Madonna] who herself was no stranger to overexposure". The video was later commercially available on Madonna's video albums The Video Collection 93:99 (1999) and Celebration: The Video Collection (2009).

Live performances and covers 

Madonna has performed the song during The Girlie Show World Tour in 1993, accompanied by back up singers Niki Haris and Donna De Lory. All three of them appeared onstage wearing long black see-through robes. Haris recalled in Lucy O'Brien's book Madonna: Like an Icon, "that was the first time [on stage] we sat down together and felt our harmonies. Madonna's voice was starting to get strong and she was into trying new things." During the bridge, they performed a fragment of Motown group The Temptations' 1971 hit "Just My Imagination (Running Away with Me)". In his review of the concert in New York City, The New York Timess Jon Pareles felt that during the performance the music was reminiscent of "Motown, girl groups and James Brown." After the song was finished, an interlude, featuring a pierrot and several dancers dressed in black outfits and holding umbrellas began. Set to an instrumental version of the song, the interlude featured a choreography partially inspired in the classic Gene Kelly musical Singin' in the Rain. According to author Michelle Morgan, Kelly himself advised Madonna on some of the choreography. The performance on the November 19, 1993, show at Sydney Cricket Ground was recorded and released on VHS and Laserdisc on April 26, 1994, as The Girlie Show: Live Down Under.

Fifteen years later, "Rain" was used as a video interlude for Madonna's Sticky & Sweet Tour. The song was remixed using elements of Eurythmics' 1984 hit "Here Comes the Rain Again" and featured the Japanese dancing duo Hamutsun Serve. The video featured a pixie finding shade under a petal during a rainstorm and witnessing the transformation of a caterpillar into a butterfly. This performance was included on the Sticky & Sweet Tour live CD and DVD release, recorded during Madonna's shows in Buenos Aires, Argentina, in December 2008. In 2000, British gothic rock band Rosetta Stone covered "Rain" for Madonna's tribute album, Virgin Voices: A Tribute to Madonna, Vol. 2. The following year, a hi-NRG/Eurodance cover by Who's That Girl! was released through Almighty Records. In 2016, Madonna's former backup singers Niki Haris and Donna De Lory covered "Rain" and released it as a digital single. Their single release consists of the acoustic version and the Willie Ray Lewis remix version.

Track listings and formats 

US 7-inch and cassette single
 "Rain" (radio remix) – 4:35
 "Waiting" (album version) – 5:45

US and Canadian CD maxi-single
 "Rain" (radio remix) – 4:35
 "Waiting" (remix featuring Everlast) – 4:41
 "Up Down Suite" – 12:13
 "Rain" (album version) – 5:24

US 12-inch vinyl; Australian and canadian cassette maxi-single
 "Rain" (radio remix) – 4:33
 "Rain" (album version) – 5:24
 "Up Down Suite" – 12:13
 "Waiting" (remix featuring Everlast) – 4:41

UK 12-inch vinyl, 12-inch picture disc, and CD single
 "Rain" (radio remix) – 4:35
 "Open Your Heart" (album version) – 4:13
 "Up Down Suite" – 12:13

German 12-inch maxi-single
 "Rain" (album edit) – 4:17
 "Rain" (remix edit) – 4:33
 "Fever" (edit one) – 4:03
 "Fever" (edit two) – 4:27

Japanese and Australian EP
 "Rain" (radio remix) – 4:35
 "Waiting" (remix featuring Everlast) – 4:41
 "Up Down Suite" – 12:13
 "Rain" (album version) – 5:24
 "Bad Girl" (extended mix) – 6:29
 "Fever" (extended 12-inch) – 6:08
 "Fever" (Shep's Remedy Dub) – 4:29
 "Fever" (Murk Boys Miami Mix) – 7:10
 "Fever" (Oscar G's Dope Dub) – 4:53
 "Rain" (video edit) – 4:32

Digital single
 "Rain" (radio remix) – 4:35
 "Waiting" (remix featuring Everlast) – 4:41
 "Rain" (radio remix edit) – 4:20
 "Up Down Suite" – 12:13
 "Rain" (video edit) – 4:33
 "Fever" (edit two) – 4:27

Credits and personnel 
Credits are adapted from the album's liner notes.
 Madonna – songwriter, producer, vocals
 Shep Pettibone – songwriter, producer, sequencing, programming, keyboard
 Robin Hancock – recording engineer
 P. Dennis Mitchell – recording engineer
 Tony Shimkin – drum programming
 Goh Hotoda – mixing engineer

Charts and certifications

Weekly charts

Year-end charts

Certifications and sales

References

Bibliography 

 
 
 
 
 
 
 
 

1990s ballads
1992 songs
1993 singles
Contemporary R&B ballads
Donna De Lory songs
Maverick Records singles
Madonna songs
Music videos directed by Mark Romanek
Pop ballads
Sire Records singles
Song recordings produced by Madonna
Song recordings produced by Shep Pettibone
Songs about weather
Songs written by Madonna
Songs written by Shep Pettibone
Warner Records singles
Works based on Wuthering Heights
Songs about sexuality